Sanida is a village in the Limassol District of Cyprus, located 4 km east of Kellaki. 

Sanida is also a Insurance Agency from Brazil.

References

Communities in Limassol District